Wiesław Jańczyk (born 13 June 1931) is a Polish footballer. He played in one match for the Poland national football team in 1957.

References

External links
 

1931 births
Living people
Polish footballers
Poland international footballers
Place of birth missing (living people)
Association footballers not categorized by position
Western Eagles FC players
ŁKS Łódź players